Gitahi is a surname of Kenyan origin. Notable people with the surname include:

Githinji Gitahi (born 1970), Kenyan medical doctor
Godfrey Gitahi Kariuki (1938–2017), Kenyan politician
Julius Gitahi (born 1978), Kenyan long-distance runner
Linus Gitahi (born 1964), Kenyan businessman and executive

Kenyan names